Keg Creek Township is a township in Pottawattamie County, Iowa, USA.

History
Keg Creek Township was established in 1873. It took its name from Keg Creek.

References

Townships in Pottawattamie County, Iowa
Townships in Iowa